The 1997–98 Detroit Red Wings season was the 72nd National Hockey League season in Detroit, Michigan.  The highlight of the Red Wings' season was winning the Stanley Cup for a second season in a row.

Regular season

Sergei Fedorov's holdout
After a lengthy holdout to start the 1997–98 season, Fedorov, a restricted free-agent, signed an offer sheet with the Carolina Hurricanes worth up to $38 million (with bonuses). The Red Wings matched the offer on February 26, 1998, ending Fedorov's holdout. The offer broke down as: $14 million for signing, $2 million for 21 regular season games and $12 million for the team reaching conference finals. $28 million for 43 total games in 1997–98 is the largest single season amount paid to an NHL athlete. Fedorov helped the Red Wings win their second consecutive Stanley Cup that year.

Season standings

Playoffs

Stanley Cup Finals
The 1998 Stanley Cup Finals were played in the 105th year of the Stanley Cup. The series was played between the Western Conference champion Detroit Red Wings and the Eastern Conference champion Washington Capitals. The Red Wings were led by captain Steve Yzerman, Head Coach Scotty Bowman and goaltender Chris Osgood. The Capitals were led by captain Dale Hunter, head coach Ron Wilson and goaltender Olaf Kolzig. The Red Wings swept the Capitals to capture their second consecutive Stanley Cup. During the presentation of the Stanley Cup, Vladimir Konstantinov was wheeled onto the ice in his wheelchair and captain Steve Yzerman gave him the cup while his teammates surrounded him.

Schedule and results

Regular season

Playoffs

Player statistics

Skaters
Note: GP = Games played; G = Goals; A = Assists; Pts = Points; +/- = Plus/minus; PIM = Penalty minutes

Goaltending
Note: GP = Games played; GS = Games started; TOI = Time on ice; W = Wins; L = Losses; T = Ties; GA = Goals against; GAA = Goals against average; SA = Shots against; SV% = Save percentage;  SO = Shutouts; G = Goals; A = Assists; PIM = Penalty minutes

† Denotes player spent time with another team before joining the Red Wings. Stats reflect time with the Red Wings only.
‡ Denotes player was traded mid-season. Stats reflect time with the Red Wings only.

Awards and records
 Clarence S. Campbell Bowl: || Detroit Red Wings
 Conn Smythe Trophy: || Steve Yzerman
 James Norris Memorial Trophy Runner-Up: || Nicklas Lidstrom

Transactions
The Red Wings have been involved in the following transactions during the 1997-98 season.

Trades

Signings

Free agents

Waivers

Draft picks
Below are the Detroit Red Wings' selections at the 1997 NHL Entry Draft, held on June 21, 1997 at Civic Arena in Pittsburgh, Pennsylvania.

Notes
 The Red Wings first-round pick went to the Carolina Hurricanes (formerly the Hartford Whalers) as the result of a trade on October 9, 1996 that sent Brendan Shanahan and Brian Glynn  to Detroit in exchange for Paul Coffey, Keith Primeau and this pick (22nd overall).

References
 Red Wings on Hockey Database

Stanley Cup championship seasons
D
D
Detroit Red Wings seasons
Western Conference (NHL) championship seasons
D
Detroit Red Wings
Detroit Red Wings